Amanda Sinegugu Dlamini (born 22 July 1988) is a former South African soccer player. She played for JVW FC as a midfielder. She represented the South Africa women's national team at the 2012 and 2016 Summer Olympics.

Early career
Dlamini was born in Harding in KwaZulu Natal. She started playing soccer in 1999 for a boys' team, Young Callies.

Career

Club
At a club level, Dlamini has played for Durban Ladies and the University of Johannesburg. Dlamini currently plays for JVW FC and was part of the team that won the 2019 Sasol League Championship.

International
She made her debut for the senior national team in 2007 in a 5–0 loss to Nigeria in an Olympic qualifier. She scored her first international goal against Netherlands. She was the top goalscorer of the 2008 Sasol Women's League. She was part of the squads that won bronze and silver medals at the 2010 African Women's Championship and 2012 African Women's Championship; at the 2010 championships, she was named Most Valuable Player. She was captain of the national team between 2011 and 2013.

She became the fifth female football player to win 100 caps for South Africa following a friendly match against the United States in July 2016, following Janine van Wyk, Nompumelelo Nyandeni, Portia Modise and Noko Matlou. Prior to the game, she said "It has always been a dream of mine to play for the national team, I have never wanted to do anything else but play football. I am what I am today because of the game. I have given so much to the game and to see myself so close to the 100 caps makes me very emotional". In the same match, American goalkeeper Hope Solo won her 100th cap for the United States.

Personal life
In 2012, she founded the Amanda Dlamini Girls Foundation aiming to provide basic help to girls in rural areas. She is now a soccer analyst at Supersport. In July 2021, she was appointed as the Senior Commercial and Marketing Manager of The South African Football Association (SAFA)

References

External links

 

1988 births
Living people
People from uMuziwabantu Local Municipality
Zulu people
South African women's soccer players
Women's association football midfielders
South Africa women's international soccer players
Footballers at the 2012 Summer Olympics
Footballers at the 2016 Summer Olympics
Olympic soccer players of South Africa
University of Johannesburg alumni
FIFA Century Club